The 1957 Le Mans Six Hour Production Car Race was an endurance motor race staged at the Caversham Circuit in Western Australia on 3 June 1957. The event, which included classes for "Sports cars" and "Closed cars", was the third annual "Six Hour Le Mans" race to be staged at Caversham. The race was won by Sydney Anderson and Sid Taylor driving an Austin-Healey 100-4, the win being the third consecutive "Six Hour Le Mans" victory by the pair.

Results

The total number of starters in the race is unknown.

The winning car covered 350 miles (564 km) at an average speed of 64 mph (103 km/h).

References

Six Hours Le Mans
Six Hour Le Mans
June 1957 sports events in Australia